Greg Flynn is an  Australian novelist whose debut book The Berlin Cross (published by Random House Australia & NZ) received positive reviews nationally when released in December 2005.

Background
Flynn was born in Perth, Western Australia, and joined WA Newspapers' afternoon newspaper "The Daily News" as a cadet reporter.

After a career in journalism in Australia and the UK, he began writing film scripts for the Yoram Gross Film Studio in Sydney.

He then moved into public relations, before writing his first novel, "The Berlin Cross", in 2005.

Reviews of The Berlin Cross
"Flynn hardly puts a foot wrong in this exciting debut novel, which moves at brisk pace through a nicely labyrinthine plot full of rich authentic detail and witty dialogue. A very impressive and highly entertaining read." - Canberra Times

“Greg Flynn's debut novel is a first-rate historical crime thriller. It understands implicitly what most readers want from the genre: a tightly written, well-plotted page-turner with more than enough twists and turns to keep you absorbed.” - 
The Age

"He is good at the furtive, frantic atmosphere of this genre" - Weekend Australian

With the Berlin Airlift as a dramatic backdrop, Flynn's novel features a Royal Military Police officer and a New York private eye who are forced to team up to find the missing Cross of Jesus Christ.

In The Berlin Cross, fictional characters interact with such historical figures as Nazi architect Albert Speer.

Flynn's latest work - Mr Wolf Presents My Wicked Guide to Life & Modern Fairy Tales for Adults - was released in 2012. An e-book edition is available iTunes and at:

Kindle edition
Other formats available at Smashwords

His blog can be found at: http://gfflynn.blogspot.com.au/

Flynn is currently completing a humorous novel set in Sydney.

Scriptwriting
Flynn's scriptwriting credits include:
 Dot and the Koala (1985)
 Dot and the Smugglers (1987) (also known as Dot and the Bunyip)

References

External links 
 Perth International Arts Festival appearance, February 2006

Year of birth missing (living people)
Australian crime writers
Australian screenwriters
Living people
People from Perth, Western Australia